Dennis John Brown (born 8 February 1944) is an English former professional footballer who played as a forward.

Club career
Born in Reading, Brown started his career with Battle Athletic before joining Chelsea, where he made his debut in 1963. He scored on his league debut against Manchester United, but would only go on to register nine more league appearances before being sold to Swindon Town in 1964. He stayed at Swindon until 1967, when he was transferred to Northampton Town in an exchange for Bobby Jones.

After just eight games for Northampton Town, Brown was involved in a serious car accident, in which he lost one kneecap and was sidelined for almost a year. He was unable to find his scoring form after the injury, and left for Aldershot Town in 1969.

After leaving the professional game, Brown moved to non-league side Margate in 1975. After one season, he joined Barnet, where he made 80 appearances, scoring ten goals. Following this, he went on to play for Cheltenham Town and Wokingham Town, before retiring in 1980.

References

1944 births
Living people
Sportspeople from Reading, Berkshire
English footballers
Association football forwards
Association football midfielders
Chelsea F.C. players
Swindon Town F.C. players
Northampton Town F.C. players
Aldershot Town F.C. players
Margate F.C. players
Barnet F.C. players
Cheltenham Town F.C. players
Wokingham & Emmbrook F.C. players